KYTV may refer to:

 KYTV (TV), a television station (channel 3 virtual/19 digital) licensed to Springfield, Missouri, United States
 KYTV (TV series), a BBC2 comedy series that aired from 1989 to 1993

See also
 Kagoshima Yomiuri Television, Japan